Silambarasan (born 3 February 1983) is an Indian actor, director, producer, and singer, who works in Tamil cinema. He began his career playing minor roles as a child artist in films produced by his father, T. Rajendar. His debut, as a lead actor, was in Kadhal Azhivathillai (2002), which was produced and directed by his father. His second film Dum (2003), a remake of the 2002 Kannada film Appu, fared well commercially. In the same year he appeared in Alai, a box office failure.

Silambarasan had three releases in 2004. The first was Kovil, which deals with the relationship between a Hindu boy and a Christian girl. Silambarasan was praised by Malathi Rangarajan of The Hindu for acting with "restraint and maturity". It was a box office success. Silambarasan appeared next in Kuththu, a remake of the Telugu film Dil. The film received unfavourable reviews but had a successful theatrical run. His final release in 2004 was Manmadhan, which he also wrote. The film was a major success, and propelled Silambarasan to stardom. The following year, he had only one release: Thotti Jaya, in which he plays an orphaned gangster who finds love. In 2006, Silambarasan had two releases: Saravana (directed by K. S. Ravikumar) and Vallavan which he helped write and directed himself. The film was a box office success. He starred in two films in 2008: the action-masala films Kaalai and Silambattam. Neither received positive reviews, but the latter was profitable.

Silambarasan's sole release in 2010 as a lead actor was the romance Vinnaithaandi Varuvaayaa, directed and written by Gautham Vasudev Menon. The film attained cult status in Tamil cinema, and was a major breakthrough in his career. It was considered an image makeover for Silambarasan as most of his earlier films were in the action genre. The following year, he appeared in two films. The first was the ensemble drama Vaanam, where he stars as an impoverished cable operator. The second was Osthe, a remake of the Hindi film Dabangg where he played a police officer. Podaa Podi, which began production in 2008 and was released in 2012, was a commercial failure. His next appearance as a lead actor was in Vaalu (2015), followed by two releases in 2016: Pandiraj's Idhu Namma Aalu and Menon's Achcham Yenbadhu Madamaiyada. He went on to appear in  Anbanavan Asaradhavan Adangadhavan (2017) and collaborated with Mani Ratnam for the first time in Chekka Chivantha Vaanam (2018) and Sundar. C in Vantha Rajavathaan Varuven (2019). After a long hiatus, STR had 2 releases in 2021: Eeswaran & Maanaadu. Upon release, Maanaadu received highly positive reviews from audiences and critics and was a blockbuster at the box office. Maanaadu proved to be a comeback film for STR. He will next be seen in a crime drama film Vendhu Thanindhathu Kaadu, which marks his third collaboration with Gautham Vasudev Menon, Corona Kumar with Director Gokul, and in a special appearance role in Maha starring Hansika Motwani as the lead. After completing these, he will start his 50th project with director Ram.

Film
All short films and web series are in Tamil, unless otherwise noted.

Short film

Television

Voice over

Notes

References

External links 
 

Male actor filmographies
Director filmographies
Indian filmographies